Gordon Robert Swinney (born 4 January 1974) is a former English cricketer.  Swinney was a right-handed batsman who bowled right-arm off break.  He was born at Bath, Somerset.

Swinney first played county cricket for Wiltshire during the 1995 season.  He played 2 Minor Counties Championship matches for the county against Wales Minor Counties and Herefordshire. He also represented the county in a single MCCA Knockout Trophy match against Cambridgeshire.

Swinney later represented the Somerset Cricket Board in a single List A match against Bedfordshire in the 2nd round of the 1999 NatWest Trophy. In his only List A match, he scored 59 runs and took a single catch.

During the 1999 Cricket World Cup, Swinney represented a Somerset XI who played against Kenya as a warm up game.

Swinney also represented Wellington (NZ) during his time in New Zealand, appearing against Central Districts in Masterton.

References

External links
Gordon Swinney at Cricinfo
Gordon Swinney at CricketArchive

1974 births
Living people
Sportspeople from Bath, Somerset
English cricketers
Wiltshire cricketers
Somerset Cricket Board cricketers